Diplodactylus ornatus, sometimes called the ornate stone gecko, is a gecko endemic to Australia.

References

Diplodactylus
Reptiles described in 1845
Taxa named by John Edward Gray
Geckos of Australia